Service Publications was established in 1995 by Clive M. Law (1954-2017), an author and historian as well as former officer of the Governor General's Foot Guards.  The company is devoted to the publication of books and periodicals regarding Canadian military subjects.  The company sells books from other publishers as well as producing its own series of books.

Following Clive's sudden death, the company was sold as a going concern to Dave Hiorth at Military Antiques, Toronto, Ontario.  In addition to one-off titles by various authors, SP also releases titles as part of their own series of books, including the following:

Weapons of War

Inexpensive pamphlets highlighting military vehicles and weapons in Canadian use

UpClose

Detailed, scholarly examinations of uniforms, weapons, equipment and insignia employed by the Canadian Army through history.  These titles are designed to give collectors, researchers and museum curators in-depth information on a single topic.  The books are written largely form primary, archival sources with extensive use of contemporary photographs.  Modern studio photographs also augments the text.

There are eight titles in the UpClose series:

Distinguishing Patches: Formation Patches of the Canadian Army, 1916-1996 by Clive M. Law. Documents the history of the design, approval and use of sleeve-worn formation patches of the Canadian Army. 1996, 

Tin Lids: Canadian Combat Helmets by Roger V. Lucy.  A detailed history of the acquisition and use of steel (and later, kevlar) helmets in the Canadian Army.  

Khaki - Uniforms of the CEF, by Clive M. Law, Examines both the uniquely Canadian uniforms as well as the standard British issues of the Great War. 1997, 

A Question of Confidence - The Ross Rifle in the Trenches by Col. A.F. Duguid, (Edited by Clive M. Law) This is an edited version of the Ross history written between the wars by the Canadian Army's Official Historian. 

Dressed to Kill by Michael A. Dorosh.  Is an in-depth examination of the Battle Dress, Service Dress and Khaki Drill uniforms issued to Canadian Other Ranks in World War II. 2001,  

Making Tracks - Tank Production in Canada by Clive M. Law.  An examination of Canadian tank production in the Second World War.  

 '37 Web - Equipping the Canadian Soldierby Ed Storey.  A look at 1937 Web Equipment, the infantry gear worn by Canadians in World War II and Korea. 2003, 

Without Warning: Canadian Sniper Equipment of the 20th Century by Clive M. Law.  A serious study of Canadian-made and Canadian-issued sniper equipment from World War I to the war in Afghanistan.

Periodical

A semi-regular periodical called Military Artifact featured articles on obscure Canadian militaria, usually using primary sources and previously unpublished contemporary photographs. ISSN 1205-7096

External links
http://www.servicepub.com
https://servicepub.com/clive-law
canadiansoldiers.com - site containing reviews of SP books as well as discussion forum frequented by several SP authors as well as the publisher.

Book publishing companies of Canada